Yamaki (written: 山木 lit. "mountain tree" or 八巻) is a Japanese surname. Notable people with the surname include:

, Japanese jazz musician
, Japanese women's footballer
, Japanese Paralympic athlete

Japanese-language surnames